The Oceanian Democratic Rally (RDO) is a militant socialist pro-independence political party in New Caledonia. It is a component of the National Union for Independence, which in turn is one of the two components of the Kanak Socialist National Liberation Front (FLNKS).

History
The RDO was founded in 1994 by local Polynesian Wallisians and Futunians favourable to the independence of New Caledonia from France. Aloïsio Sako, who had served as President of the Polynesian-based Oceanian Union and was a police officer, was removed from office by the then-Minister of the Interior Charles Pasqua.

The party currently holds one seat in the Congress of New Caledonia representing the South Province, which has a sizeable Polynesian population.

Political parties in New Caledonia
Secessionist organizations
Socialist parties in France
Melanesian socialism